Vanessa L. Gibson (born March 19, 1979) is an American politician who has served as the Borough President of The Bronx since 2022. She served as a member of the New York City Council, representing the 16th district from 2014 to 2021. A Democrat, she was elected Bronx Borough President in November 2021 to a four-year term beginning January 2022, running on a platform focused on recovery from COVID-19 impact, food insecurity and housing instability. She is the first female and first African American Bronx Borough President.

Life and career
Gibson is a lifelong resident of New York City and born was raised in Bedford-Stuyvesant. She was graduated Murry Bergtraum High School in 1997. She earned a Bachelor's degree in Sociology from the State University of New York at Albany in May 2001. Gibson received a M.P.A. from Baruch College (City University of New York) in May 2009.

In her senior year of undergraduate studies, Gibson interned for Assemblywoman Aurelia Greene. Two years later, in November 2003, Gibson was promoted to the District Manager for Greene's 77th District. She was subsequently elected to the New York State Assembly in a June 2009 special election. Her assumption was in succession of her mentor Greene, who had joined the cabinet of Bronx Borough President Ruben Diaz, Jr. earlier that year.

New York City Council

On November 5, 2013, Gibson successfully ran for New York City Council after winning a fairly contentious primary election. Within her district, Gibson is particularly adamant about eliminating homelessness and hunger. Gibson held Annual Housing Conferences to solidify the relationship between landlords and tenants in District 16. She held free meal events to feed the children of the South Bronx, and designated much of her district's budget allocation towards the schools and senior homes within her district.

As chairperson of the Public Safety Committee, Gibson has worked to mend the tense relationship between New York civilians and the New York Police Department (NYPD). In the wake of public outrage over the deaths of civilians such as Eric Garner, she assured the public through various media outlets that she would rectify the NYPD transparency system and better equip officers for public service. She worked with Mayor Bill de Blasio, Council Speaker Melissa Mark-Viverito, and the Civilian Complaints Review Board (CCRB) to implement the use of body cameras on officer uniforms, GPS tracking devices for officers, and technological advancement funding for the NYPD. Gibson also addressed the school-to-prison pipeline. On March 31, 2015,  Gibson introduced an amendment to the 2011 Student Safety Act. The bill, Intro 0730-2015, co-sponsored by Council Member Corey Johnson, was designed to mandate the release of school disciplinary activity on the Department of Education's website. The amendment also called for statistical data of student arrests to be reported to the NYC Council. Intro 730 was signed into law on October 13, 2015. It was the first New York City law to be introduced to the NYC Council by Council Member Gibson.

Gibson responded to the 2015 Bronx Legionnaires' disease outbreaks that primarily plagued her constituents. She worked with Mayor Bill de Blasio, Speaker Melissa Mark-Viverito, Bronx Borough President Ruben Diaz, Jr., the Department of Health and Mental Hygiene (DOHMH), among many other New York City authorities to investigate the cause of the outbreak and implement prophylactic legislation accordingly. On August 18, 2015, Gibson stood alongside the Mayor as he signed Local Law 866 (Int 0866-2015), a historical legislation that mandates cooling tower registration and regulates the maintenance of citywide towers.

Gibson's record shows a commitment to conservation. As New York City Council Member she reportedly secured $25M for Grant Park, $4.6M for Bridge Playground, $4M for Corporal Fischer Park, and supported a $100M renovation of the Bronx's only state park, Roberto Clemente State Park.

Election history

References

External links

Office of the Bronx Borough President

|-

|-

20th-century African-American people
20th-century African-American women
21st-century African-American politicians
21st-century African-American women
21st-century American politicians
21st-century American women politicians
1979 births
African-American New York City Council members
African-American state legislators in New York (state)
African-American women in politics
Baruch College alumni
Living people
Democratic Party members of the New York State Assembly
Murry Bergtraum High School alumni
New York City Council members
Politicians from the Bronx
University at Albany, SUNY alumni
Women state legislators in New York (state)
Women New York City Council members